Temple Freda, built in 1912, is a synagogue in Bryan, Texas. It was added to the National Register of Historic Places on September 22, 1983.

History
Temple Freda, a part of Brazos County, Texas history, is one of the three oldest religious buildings still in use in Bryan, along with St. Andrew's Episcopal Church and St. Anthony's Catholic Church. Temple Freda is named for Ethel Freda Kaczer (1860–1912). Her husband, Benjamin Kaczer (1850–1938), was president of the community when the synagogue was built. The temple is unique for a Jewish place of worship in that it is named after a woman.

Since 1982, Texas A&M University's Center of Heritage Conservation has focused on the history of Temple Freda as one of its historical projects. The temple structure is built in Greek Revival style and also exhibits Classical Revival style with Beaux-Arts architecture elements.

The building began to decline after World War II when worshippers began migrating over to the newer student-oriented Hillel synagogue in College Station. In 2013, a group of citizens from Bryan, Texas joined together to restore the deteriorating building. The City of Bryan became acting custodian over the restoration project. It was determined that after restoration, the building would not be used as a religious facility rather it will be used for community activities such as weddings, small receptions, educational activities and the like.

Relationship with Texas A&M Hillel
In 1958, Texas A&M Hillel opened up a building in College Station, Texas. During this period, some members of Temple Freda in Bryan, Texas left to attend services at the Hillel Foundation building in College Station. Presently, Temple Freda's Torah is under the care of Texas A&M Hillel.

Relationship with Congregation Beth Shalom (Jewish Congregation of Bryan-College Station)

In 1968 Congregation Beth Shalom, Bryan TX was formed to serve the Jewish community of the Brazos Valley.  It included many former members of Temple Freda.  Presently Temple Freda's Cemetery is under the care of Congregation Beth Shalom.

Texas A&M University College of Architecture project
Since 1982, Texas A&M University's "Center of Heritage Conservation" has focused on the history of Temple Freda as one of its historical projects. The temple structure is built in Greek Revival style and also exhibits Classical Revival style with Beaux-Arts architecture elements. Temple Freda is associated with the Jewish cemetery "Temple Freda Cemetery" and is also a part of the National Register of Historic Places of Texas.

See also

National Register of Historic Places listings in Brazos County, Texas

Further reading
Toubin, Rosa Levin, Bryan-College Station: Temple Freda. Texas Jewish Historical Society.
Page, Bill. Before Temple Freda: Jewish residents of Brazos County, Texas, 1865-1913. 1998.

References

External links

Bryan–College Station
Jews and Judaism in Brazos County, Texas
Former synagogues in Texas
Buildings and structures in Brazos County, Texas
Greek Revival synagogues
Greek Revival architecture in Texas
Synagogues on the National Register of Historic Places in Texas
Bryan, Texas
National Register of Historic Places in Brazos County, Texas